Calliotectum piersonorum is a species of sea snail, a marine gastropod mollusk in the family Volutidae, the volutes.

Description
       Bouchet, P.; Poppe, G. T. (1995). A review of the deep-water volute genus Calliotectum (Gastropoda: Volutidae). in: Bouchet, P. (Ed.) Résultats des Campagnes MUSORSTOM 14. Mémoires du Muséum national d'Histoire naturelle. Série A, Zoologie. 167: pp. 499–525. (look up in IMIS).

Description

Distribution

References

Volutidae
Gastropods described in 1995